Cityrider is a bus service in Tyne and Wear, England, which connects Springwell Village, Wrekenton, Gateshead and Newcastle upon Tyne with Washington, Hylton Castle and Sunderland.

History 
The service was formerly branded as Fab Fifty Six, with a number of Volvo B9TL/Wright Gemini 2 double-deck vehicles branded in a floral orange livery. Prior to the service's upgrade in January 2014, it was operated by Scania L94UB/Wright Solar single-deck vehicles in the Fab Fifty Six livery.

In May 2009, night services were introduced on Friday and Saturday nights. In January 2014, 17 Volvo B9TL Eclipse Gemini double-decker buses were introduced on the route.

In summer 2020, some services on this route were operated with open-top buses.

A daily 24-hour service was introduced in May 2021. It is currently one of three services (including services 21 and 60) operated by Go North East which run to a daily 24-hour service.

Service and operations 

The service currently operates between Newcastle and Sunderland up to every 15 minutes (Monday to Saturday), up to every 20 minutes on Sunday and half-hourly during the evening. Services also operate throughout the night on an hourly frequency. It is currently operated by a fleet of Euro 6 Volvo B9TL/Wright Gemini 2 double-deck vehicles, branded in a two-tone orange and red livery.

References 

56 Cityrider